Passenger from the "Equator" is a 1968 Soviet children's adventure film directed by Aleksandr Kurochkin.

Plot
Young swimmer Ilmar sails on the ship "Equator" to the pioneer camp, located somewhere on the Black Sea shore. Accidentally, he witnesses a strange event: one of the passengers, a foreigner (he is a magician and a "businessman"), Mr. Pipp secretly throws a suspicious object into the sea (radio beacon). Pipp discovers a boy nearby and fearing revelation, pushes him overboard, and no one notices what has occurred on the boat.

Some time later, the leader of the pioneer detachment finds Ilmar on the shore of the stormy sea, who does not remember how he came to be in the water. Everything looks as if he fell into the water from the pier. Soon Ilmar and his new friends in the pioneer camp will again meet with the mysterious stranger ...

Cast
Jüri Krjukov - Ilmar
Yuri Puss - Glenn
Vyacheslav Tsyupa - Andre
Victor Morus - Igor
Tatiana Goryachkina - Galya
Igor Pushakov - Taratuta
Sergey Makridin - Zhenya
Mikhail Volkov - Philip Maximovich Kluchik, Hydroacoustic Engineer
Alexander Martynov - Marat, the leader
Arina Aleinikova - Natasha, the nurse
Vladimir Kenigson - Pavel Alexandrovich Gabush
Yuri Chekulaev - Mr. Pipp, passenger "merchant"
Nikolai Gorlov - "The Lun," the old man
Tamara Yarenko - Tamara Yakovlevna Kalinina, head of the pioneer camp
Leonid Dovlatov - doctor
Leonid Okunev

Vocals
Elena Kamburova — song The Little Prince.

References

External links

Soviet children's films
1980s children's adventure films
Russian children's adventure films
Gorky Film Studio films